Patri Friedman (born July 29, 1976) is an American libertarian, anarcho-capitalist, and theorist of political economy. He founded The Seasteading Institute, a non-profit that explores the creation of sovereign ocean colonies.

Early life
Named after family friend Patri Pugliese, Friedman grew up in King of Prussia, Pennsylvania, and is a graduate of Upper Merion Area High School, class of 1994, where he went by the name Patri Forwalter-Friedman. He graduated from Harvey Mudd College in 1998, and went on to Stanford University to obtain his master's degree in computer science. He also holds an MBA from New York Institute of Technology – Ellis College. He worked as a software engineer at Google. As a poker player, he cashed in the World Series of Poker four times.

The Seasteading Institute

Friedman was executive director of The Seasteading Institute, founded in 2008, with a half-million-dollar donation from venture capitalist Peter Thiel. The Institute's mission is "to establish permanent, autonomous ocean communities to enable experimentation and innovation with diverse social, political, and legal systems". This was initially a part-time project – one day a week while working as a Google engineer the rest of the time – but Friedman left Google on July 29, 2008 to spend more time on seasteading. He and partner Wayne C. Gramlich hoped to float the first prototype seastead in the San Francisco Bay by 2010. At the October 2010 Seasteading social, it was announced that current plans were to launch a seastead by 2014.

Since attending the Burning Man festival in 2000, Friedman imagined creating a water festival called Ephemerisle as a Seasteading experiment and Temporary Autonomous Zone.  Through The Seasteading Institute, Friedman was able to start the Ephemerisle festival in 2009, aided by TSI's James Hogan as event organizer and Chicken John Rinaldi as chief builder.  The first Ephemerisle is chronicled in a documentary by Jason Sussberg. Since 2010, the event has been annual and community-run.

Future Cities Development
On July 31, 2011, Friedman stepped down from the position as executive director of The Seasteading Institute, but remained chairman of the board. Later, he co-founded the Future Cities Development Corporation, a project to establish a self-governing charter city within the borders of Honduras. In 2012, the Future Cities Development Corporation ceased operations.

Pronomos Capital
In 2019, Friedman founded Pronomos Capital, a venture capital firm whose purpose is to bankroll the construction of experimental cities on vacant tracts of land in developing countries. Like The Seasteading Institute, Pronomos Capital is backed by Peter Thiel. Most of the cities will be aimed at foreign businesses seeking friendlier tax treatment.

Poker career
During his poker career, Patri Freidman was predicted to become a world champion by Card Player Magazine. However, he has not won a poker Championship as of 2019.

Family 
Patri is the grandson of Nobel Prize-winning economist Milton Friedman and economist Rose Friedman and son of economist and physicist David D. Friedman. He has two children by his first wife. As of February 10, 2018, he is married to Brit Benjamin with whom he has one child. Patri and Brit are self described transhumanists and rationalists, they have arranged to be cryonically preserved after their legal death.

References

External links

 Let A Thousand Nations Bloom, blog about competitive government by Friedman, Jonathan Wilde, Mike Gibson, Will Chamberlain, and Michael Strong
 
 Podcast interview: "WS Radio: Patri Friedman Audio", Western Standard, 6-19-08
 Lee, Timothy B. "Seasteading: Engineering the Long Tail of Nations", ArsTechnica, September 6, 2008
 Reason.com "20,000 Nations Above the Sea", 5-08-09
 NBC LA "Direct Impact: NBC Interview with Patri Friedman"

1976 births
Living people
21st-century American engineers
American anarcho-capitalists
American libertarians
American people of Austrian-Jewish descent
American people of Hungarian-Jewish descent
American people of Ukrainian-Jewish descent
American poker players
American political philosophers
American software engineers
American transhumanists
Friedman family
Harvey Mudd College alumni
Jewish activists
Jewish American social scientists
Jewish engineers
Libertarian theorists
New York Institute of Technology alumni
People from Blacksburg, Virginia
Stanford University alumni